R408 road  may refer to:
 R408 road (Ireland)
 R408 road (South Africa)